Kakuban (覚鑁/覺鑁; 1095–1143), known posthumously as Kōgyō-Daishi (興教大師) was a priest of the Shingon sect of Buddhism in Japan and credited as a reformer, though his efforts also led to a schism between  and . Kakuban is also famous for his introduction of the "esoteric nembutsu".

Biography
Kakuban was born in Fujitsu-no-shō (Hizen Province, nowadays part of Kashima City, Saga Prefecture) about three hundred years after Shingon Buddhism was first founded by Kūkai (空海). His given name was Yachitose-maro (弥千歳麿).

The third of four children, his father died at the age of 10, so he renounced the world at age 13 to enter the priesthood and became a pupil of the famous teacher, Kanjo (寛助) in Kyoto, who in turn had founded the Jōju-in (成就院). Kakuban had briefly studied the Kusha and Hossō teachings at Kōfuku-ji in Nara before returning to his master. At that time, he was given the ordination name of Shōgaku-bō Kakuban (正覚房覚鑁). After prolonged training in Buddhism at Tōdai-ji in Nara, the twenty-year-old received full ordination. Kakuban left for Mount Kōya (Kōya-san), then the center of the Shingon sect, to pursue further learning of Shingon Buddhism and its founder under the tutelage of Shōren (青蓮), a devout follower of the Pure Land teachings.

By age 30, he received patronage from the noble families in Kyoto, including Cloistered Emperor Toba's permission to build the Denbō-in (伝法院) on Mt. Koya as a center for studying Buddhism. The following year, he constructed the Daidenbō-in (大伝法院).

Schism
When he was thirty-six, Kakuban took leadership in the revival of the Shingon Sect, by attempting to unify the existing branches of Ono (小野) and Hirosawa (広沢). Further, he attempted to assert authority of the Shingon sect from Mt. Koya, not the traditional seat at Tō-ji in Kyoto. In time, he came to govern the entire religious district of Kōyasan as the chief priest under Imperial decree. This led to animosity from some monks, who called for his expulsion. Kakuban soon resigned from his post as chief priest (1135), and retired to Mitsugon-in (密厳院).

The animosity continued, however, and armed monks burned down the Denbō-in Temple in 1139. Kakuban and his pupils fled to Negoro-ji, where Kakuban ended his days at the age of 49 on December 12, 1143. According to legend, he died while sitting in the lotus posture, facing an image of Vairocana's Pure Land. His ashes remain buried in a tomb in the Okunoin cemetery there.

One of his disciples, Raiyu (頼瑜, 1226–1304) moved the Daidenbō-in and the Mitsugon-in Halls to Negoro-ji in 1288 and established the independence of a new school called .

Teachings 

Kakuban, in keeping with Shingon thought, felt that the regular nembutsu used in Pure Land Buddhist practices contained esoteric elements as well.

Similarly, he analyzed mantras related to Amitabha Buddha in the Shingon tradition, in order to discover their hidden meanings.

References

Sources

 
 Johnson, Peter Lunde, trans. (2020).  An Esoteric Explanation of the Name ‘Infinite Life & Light’ (Amita Hishaku, 阿彌陀秘釋) by Kakuban, from The Land of Pure Bliss

External links
  Bibliography
  Bibliography
 
 
 

1095 births
1143 deaths
Japanese Buddhist clergy
Shingon Buddhism
Founders of Buddhist sects
 
Heian period Buddhist clergy
12th-century Buddhist monks